Concordia University, St. Paul is a private university in Saint Paul, Minnesota. It was founded in 1893 and enrolls nearly 5,600 students. It is a member of the Concordia University System, which is operated by the second-largest Lutheran church body in the United States, the Lutheran Church–Missouri Synod. The school was a two year college until 1964. The present name Concordia University, St. Paul was adopted in 1997.

Academics
CSP offers a wide variety of programs including undergraduate majors and minors, graduate programs, adult undergraduate degree programs, continuing education classes and certificates, and licensure and colloquy programs. Many of these programs are also offered in an online degree format through the school's online campus. The school oversees students in Portland, Oregon enrolled in the Accelerated Bachelor of Science in Nursing program, which was absorbed in 2020 after Concordia University, Portland closed. In 2023 CSP announced the creation of CSP Global, an online branch dedicated to serving traditional and non-traditional. Forty undergraduate and graduate programs are offered through CSP Global. 

Concordia University is accredited by (among others) the Higher Learning Commission. Concordia University, St. Paul has been accredited since 1967.

In Fall 2020, CSP enrolled 5,567 students, of whom 1,756 were on the St. Paul campus. For the second straight year, there were more than 2,000 graduate students.

Notable faculty include writer Eric Dregni and theologian Reed Lessing.

Athletics

Concordia–St. Paul athletic teams are the Golden Bears. The university is a member of the Division II level of the National Collegiate Athletic Association (NCAA), primarily competing in the Northern Sun Intercollegiate Conference (NSIC) since the 1999–2000 academic year.

Concordia–St. Paul competes in 19 intercollegiate varsity sports: Men's sports include baseball, basketball, cross country, football, golf and track & field; while women's sports include basketball, cheerleading, cross country, dance, golf, lacrosse, soccer, softball, swimming & diving, track & field and volleyball; and co-ed sports include eSports.

Facilities
The Gangelhoff Center hosts several of the school's sports teams.

See also
 List of colleges and universities in Minnesota
 Higher education in Minnesota

References

External links

 Official website
 Official athletics website

 
Universities and colleges affiliated with the Lutheran Church–Missouri Synod
Universities and colleges in Saint Paul, Minnesota
Educational institutions established in 1893
1893 establishments in Minnesota
Private universities and colleges in Minnesota